Enzo Lombardo (born 16 April 1997) is a French professional footballer who plays as a midfielder for Spanish club SD Huesca.

Club career
Lombardo was born in Décines-Charpieu, and began his career with Lyon. Released at the age of 16, he subsequently joined AS Saint-Priest, and made his senior debut with the Championnat de France Amateur club in the 2015–16 season.

On 28 June 2016, Lombardo joined RCD Mallorca and was initially assigned to the reserves in Segunda División B. The following 31 January, however, he was loaned to Tercera División side UD Poblense until June.

On 9 July 2018, after being a regular starter with Mallorca B, Lombardo was loaned to third division side Racing de Santander for the campaign. On 9 August of the following year, after achieving promotion to Segunda División, his loan was renewed for a further year.

Lombardo made his professional debut on 17 August 2019, starting in a 0–1 home loss against Málaga CF. He scored his first professional goals on 20 October, netting a brace in a 3–3 away draw against CD Tenerife.

In June 2020, Lombardo suffered a serious knee injury, which left him unregistered for the entire 2020–21 campaign. On 6 July 2021, he signed a three-year contract with SD Huesca also in the third division.

References

External links

1997 births
Living people
People from Décines-Charpieu
French footballers
Association football wingers
Championnat National 2 players
FC Bourgoin-Jallieu players
AS Saint-Priest players
Segunda División players
Segunda División B players
Tercera División players
RCD Mallorca B players
RCD Mallorca players
Racing de Santander players
SD Huesca footballers
French expatriate footballers
French expatriate sportspeople in Spain
Expatriate footballers in Spain
Sportspeople from Lyon Metropolis
Footballers from Auvergne-Rhône-Alpes